Charles Bateman Timberlake (September 25, 1854 – May 31, 1941) was a U.S. Representative from Colorado.

Born in Wilmington, Ohio, Timberlake attended the common schools and Earlham College, Richmond, Indiana from 1871 to 1874.
He taught school. He moved to Colorado in 1885, and settled near Holyoke, Phillips County.
He engaged in agricultural pursuits and stock raising. He served as member of the Republican State committee 1892–1910. He served as superintendent of schools of Phillips County 1889–1895 and as county clerk 1895–1897. He was appointed receiver of the United States land office at Sterling, Colorado, on July 1, 1897, and served until April 30, 1914.

Timberlake was elected as a Republican to the Sixty-fourth and to the eight succeeding Congresses (March 4, 1915 – March 3, 1933). He was an unsuccessful candidate for renomination in 1932. He engaged in banking in Sterling, Colorado, until his death there on May 31, 1941. He was interred in Grandview Cemetery, Fort Collins.

References

External links
 

1854 births
1941 deaths
Earlham College alumni
Republican Party members of the United States House of Representatives from Colorado
People from Phillips County, Colorado
People from Sterling, Colorado
People from Wilmington, Ohio